Robert Allen (22 December 1908 – 8 April 1992) was an Australian rules footballer who played with Fitzroy in the Victorian Football League (VFL).

Notes

External links 
		

1908 births
1992 deaths
Australian rules footballers from Victoria (Australia)
Fitzroy Football Club players